Colonel Zackquill Morgan was the son of Welsh-born Colonel Morgan Morgan and Catherine Garretson, the first known white settlers in what would become the U.S. state of West Virginia.  He was born in Orange [now Berkeley] County, [West] Virginia, in 1735.  Zackquill Morgan founded Morgantown, West Virginia in Monongalia County, where he died at sixty years old on New Year's Day in 1795 and was buried in the cemetery at Prickett's Fort.  The grave was "marked by rough native sandstone slab, on which was crudely chiseled the simple lettering, Z. M. Jan. 1, 1795."

Zackquill Morgan's unusual name is spelled many different ways in old Christian records.  For example:  Zacuil, Zackwell, Zackquell and Zackil, but rarely as Zackquill, which according to the old Episcopal Church record book at Bunker Hill, West Virginia, is the way Colonel Morgan Morgan spelled his son's name.

Biography

Early life
According to family tradition, Zackquill and his brother David served with Virginia forces in Braddock's ill-fated expedition (1755) and in the more successful expedition by General Forbes in 1758. In 1761 Zackquill received from his father one thousand acres (4 km²) of land in Berkeley County which had been patented in November 1735. Most historians believe that David Morgan and his younger brother Zackquill Morgan were the next Europeans to attempt a permanent settlement in Monongalia County. About 1765 or '66, he migrated, with David, to Georges Creek, Pennsylvania. They left Delaware and reached present-day Morgantown in 1766 or '67. A family tradition attributes the settlement of Zackquill Morgan, in 1768, but at that time he appears to have been still living in what was later Fayette County. According to a deed on file at Uniontown, Pennsylvania, Zackquill was living at Great Meadows, Bedford [now Fayette] County, Pennsylvania, on August 28, 1771, when he sold his farm there.
  
Zackquill may have been living near his brother David at Pleasantville until 1779 or '80. Despite the accounts of various historians, we still do not know when Zackquill Morgan settled on the site of Morgantown, nor indeed, who made the first settlement on that site. Regardless of when Zackquill moved to the site of the city to bear his name, we find a surveyor's record indicating that the land was surveyed for him on April 29, 1781. A courthouse record says: "John Madison assee of Nicholas Decker is intitled to Four Hundred acres of land in Monongalia County on the Monona River to include his settlement made thereon in the year 1766 and prior to any settlement made near the same."

During the Revolutionary War, Morgan was "County Lieutenant" of Monongalia County with the title of colonel. He commanded part of the Virginia Minute Men during that war, with about 600 men and was with General Gates at the Battle of Saratoga in October 1777. He lost nearly half of his men in that battle.

Establishment of Morgantown
In 1782, after resolution of the Pennsylvania/Virginia boundary dispute made his home a part of Pennsylvania, the Monongalia County seat was moved south, first to Colonel John Evans's home and ultimately to Zackquill Morgan's home in present-day Morgantown. The county court was held in Morgan's home while a courthouse was constructed in the public square in what was then called Morgan's Town. The wooden court house was completed sometime between 1782 and 1785 at a cost of $250. It was at about this time (1784) that George Washington visited the area. In October 1785, at Colonel Morgan's request, the Virginia General Assembly specified that  of his land was to be laid out in lots of a half acre each, and a town, named Morgans-Town, established on the site. The lots were to be auctioned off and the proceeds given to Colonel Morgan. Initially, the land deeds required purchasers to build a house of at least  on the lot within four years, but because of Indian hostilities the four-year time limit was extended in 1789 by the Virginia General Assembly to an additional five years. Morgantown was established by an act reading as follows:Be it enacted by the General Assembly that  of land, the property of Zackquill Morgan, lying in the county of Monongalia shall be laid out in lots of half an acre each, with convenient streets which shall be established as a town by the name of "Morgans Town".

In 2016, a statue commemorating Morgan's role in founding the Morgantown was erected near the town's Spruce Street parking garage. Commissioned by the City of Morgantown, it was created by sculptor Jamie Lester.

Later years
Zackquill Morgan opened the town's first tavern in 1783.

Before Zackquill's death in 1795, he lived in a house on Front Street later owned by his son Zackquill. This is the house in which Drusilla, granddaughter of Zackquill I, was born in 1814 and in which she lived continuously until her death in 1904.

The inventory of Zackquill Morgan's personal property, made on December 6, 1795, by James Dunn, Morgan Morgan, and Richard Merrifield, included the following:  1 mare and colt 10 pounds 15 shillings; 1 old red cow 2 pounds; 1 old red cow and bell and collar 2.7.6; 1 dark brown heifer (3 years old) 2.10.6; 1 cow and calf 2.7.6; 1 small year-old heifer .15; 1 small year-old steer .15; 2 hogs @ .15 each 1.10; 1 sow and 3 shotes, .24, 2.14; 1 pair plow irons .25; 5 sheep @ 9/6 3.12; 1 coat, wescot and pair of stocking 4; 1 bed and furniture 5; 7 pewter plates and 1 pewter salt cellar .13.3; 1 old tea kettle; 1 candle stick; 2 flat irons; 1 old iron kettle and hooks 6/3; 1 pot and 2 trimels .15, 1.13; total 47 pounds and 14 shillings.

Family
ZACKQUILL MORGAN was born on 08 Sep 1735 in Orange (later Frederick) County, Virginia (later Berkeley County, West Virginia). He died on 01 Jan 1795 in Morgantown, Monongalia County, Virginia (later West Virginia). He married (1) He married NANCY PAXTON in 1755 in Frederick County, Virginia (later Berkeley County, West Virginia). She was born in 1735 in Somerset County, New Jersey. She died in 1762 in Augusta County, Virginia. (2) DRUSILLA SPRINGER on 15 Sep 1765 in Frederick County, Virginia, daughter of Dennis Springer Sr. and Ann Prickett. She was born on 9 May 1746 in Burlington County, New Jersey. She died in Aug 1796 in Morgantown, Monongalia County, Virginia.

Zackquill Morgan and Nancy Paxton had the following children:
i. NANCY ANNE MORGAN was born in 1759 in Augusta, Hampshire, West Virginia, USA. She died in 1816 in Augusta, Hampshire, West Virginia, USA. She married (1) JOHN PIERPONT in 1774 in West Virginia, USA, son of Francis Pierpoint Jr. and Sarah Richardson. He was born in 1742 in Frederick, Maryland, USA. He died on 04 Mar 1796 in Morgantown, Monongalia, West Virginia, USA. She married (2) WILLIAM STEPHENSON.

ii. TEMPERANCE MORGAN was born in 1760 in Morgantown, Monongalia, West Virginia, USA. She died on 28 May 1849 in Augusta, Virginia, USA. She married JAMES COCHRAN on 20 Jul 1777.

iii. EVAN MORGAN was born in 1762 in Augusta, Virginia, USA.
 
iv. CATHERINE MORGAN was born in 1763 in Augusta, Virginia, USA. She married JACOB SCOTT.

Zackquill Morgan and Drusilla Springer had the following children:
v. LEVI MORGAN was born on 26 Jun 1766 in Morgantown, Monongalia, West Virginia, USA. He died in 1828 in Jefferson, Kentucky, USA. He married (1) ELIZABETH GRAHAM on 13 Oct 1815 in Jefferson, Kentucky, USA, daughter of Elias Graham and Margaret Brewer. She was born in 1797. She died on 19 Jul 1887 in Jefferson, Kentucky, USA.

vi. MORGAN MORGAN was born on 07 Nov 1767. He died in 1852. He married (1) MARY HANET. He married (2) SUSANNAH MARTIN.

vii. CHARLES W MORGAN was born on 28 October 1769. He died in 1819. 

viii. JAMES MORGAN was born on 24 Nov 1771. He died on 24 May 1855. He married DOROTHY PRICKETT in 1796.

viii. URIAH MORGAN was born on 22 Jul 1774. He died in 1851. He married SARAH PRICKETT.

ix. ZADOCK MORGAN was born on 24 Jul 1776.

x. HORATIO MORGAN was born on 09 Apr 1778.

xi. ZACKQUILL MORGAN II was born on 01 Aug 1782. He died in 1813. He married ELIZABETH MADERA on 07 Apr 1806.

xii. SARAH MORGAN was born on 11 Feb 1784. She married JAMES CLELLAND in 1818.

xiii. HANNAH MORGAN was born on 09 Dec 1786. She died on 27 May 1860. She married DAVID BARKER on 02 Jan 1810.

xiv. DRUSILLA MORGAN was born on 09 Oct 1788. She married JACOB RIVES SWISHER on 26 Apr 1810 in Morgantown, Monongalia, West Virginia, USA. He was born in May 1785 in Winchester, Frederick, Virginia, USA. He died on 13 Feb 1858.

xv. RACHEL MORGAN was born on 29 Jun 1790. She died in Jan 1864.

See also

 Cool Spring Farm (Gerrardstown, West Virginia)

References

Citations and footnotes

Further reading
The Prickett Fence, pg. 49 Volume 9 Issue 3, printed April 2002
Churchman, Charles R. "Chapter 3, Zacquill Morgan." Kentucky Descendants of Colonel Morgan Morgan. Louisville: Charles R Churchman, 1994. 18-23. Print.
THE MONONGALIA STORY - CHAPTER NINETEEN 1795 - A Bicentennial History II.  The Pioneers, by Earl L. Core, West Virginia University and Morgantown Public Library.  McClain Printing Company, Parsons, West Virginia 1976, pg. 240-241-242-243:  The Passing of the Patron.

1735 births
1795 deaths
18th-century American Episcopalians
American city founders
American people of Welsh descent
American pioneers
British North American Anglicans
Morgan family of West Virginia
People from Berkeley County, West Virginia
People from Morgantown, West Virginia
People of Virginia in the American Revolution
People of Virginia in the French and Indian War
People in Dunmore's War